AMAD Project (or AMAD Plan) is an Iranian scientific project, started in 1989 and stopped in 2003 according to IAEA, that is suspected by Israel to have nonetheless continued, with the aim of developing nuclear weapons. Iran have denied the existence of any program aimed at the development of a nuclear explosive device, and in particular denied the existence of the AMAD Plan when reporting additional details to IAEA in 2015.

IAEA investigation
Starting in 2005, IAEA gathered information from its member states indicating that Iran had launched in the late 1980s a plan aimed at the development of a nuclear explosive device. This information indicated that these activities started within Departments of the Physics Research Centre (PHRC), and by the early 2000s came to be focused on projects of the Amad plan under the leadership of Mohsen Fakhrizadeh. According to IAEA, the programme gathered several projects aiming at designing and integrating nuclear payloads (projects 110 and 111), manufacture explosive components (project 3), enrich uranium (project 4), ...

Same information indicated that "activities under the AMAD Plan were brought to a halt in late 2003 and that the work was fully recorded, equipment and work places were either cleaned or disposed of so that there would be little to identify the sensitive nature of the work that had been undertaken."

In August 2015, under the Road-map, Iran provided the IAEA with additional details and denied the existence of any program aimed at the development of a nuclear explosive device, and in particular denied the existence of the AMAD Plan.

In a 2015 report named Final Assessment on Past and Present Outstanding Issues regarding Iran’s Nuclear Programme, IAEA assessed that:
"a range of activities relevant to the development of a nuclear explosive device were conducted in Iran prior to the end of 2003 as a coordinated effort, and some activities took place after 2003 [but] these activities did not advance beyond feasibility and scientific studies, and the acquisition of certain relevant technical competences and capabilities. The Agency has no credible indications of activities in Iran relevant to the development of a nuclear explosive device after 2009".

2018 Israeli accusations

On 30 April 2018, Israeli Prime Minister Benjamin Netanyahu referred to AMAD project to argue that Iran continued to pursue a program of nuclear weapons development. Based on  100,000 documents allegedly smuggled by Mossad from Iran, he stated that the "mission statement [of AMAD project] was to design, produce and test five warheads, each with ten kiloton TNT yield for integration on a missile"
. Foreign Minister Javad Zarif tweeted to say the evidence was a "rehash of old allegations" which had already been dealt with by the United Nations nuclear watchdog.

According to David Albright, of the Institute for Science and International Security, the archive said that Iran's weapon program was more advanced than believed previously in the West and that should Iran pull out of the JCPOA it would be able to produce weapons swiftly, possibly within a few months.

See also
 Iran and weapons of mass destruction
 Iran–Israel relations
 Iran–Israel proxy conflict

References

Nuclear program of Iran
Iran–Israel proxy conflict